Sherlock Films is a Spanish film production company.

Films

2011
Kerity, La Casa de los Cuentos (Eleanor's Secret) (Gaumont / Haut et Court / GKIDS)
L'Illusionniste (The Illusionist) (Pathé / Sony Pictures Classics / Warner Bros. France)
De Cintura para Arriba (From the Waist Up) (Intra Movies / Rai Cinema / O1 Distribution)
El Hombre Cerilla (Man Match)
La Bendición de la Tierra (The Blessing of Earth) (Real Port)
El Verano de Martino (Martino Summer) (Rai Trade / Rai Cinema / Moviemento Film)
Pánico en la Granja (Called Panic) (Gebeka Films / Made In Films)
Miradas de Amor (Looks of Love) (Intra Movies)

2012
Obsession (Gaumont)
Abbot y Costello Contra los Fantasmas (Abbot and Costello Meet Frankenstein) (Universal Pictures)
Don Gato y su Pandilla (Top Cat: The Movie) (Warner Bros. Mexico / Ánima Estudios / Illusion Studios / Motion Pictures S.A. / Vertigo Films)
Inmaduros (Immatures) (Intra Movies / Lotus Production)
Adam Resucitado (Adam Resurrected) (Bleiberg Entertainment)

External links
Official Website

Film production companies of Spain
Mass media in Madrid